AIMS Institutes, formerly Acharya Institute of Management and Sciences (AIMS), is a private, self-financed institution in Bengaluru affiliated to the Bengaluru University. It offers postgraduate, undergraduate and certificate courses in fields such as management, computer applications, social work, hospitality and culinary arts. Established in 1994, the institute has, since then, been accredited by the National Assessment and Accreditation Council (NAAC) with a CGPA of 3.46 on a 4-point scale.

The management programmes offered by its School of Business (MBA, PGPIB,PGDM, BBM and B.Com) have been accredited by the International Assembly for Collegiate Business Education (IACBE), USA.

AIMS Institutes is one of several institutes run by the JMJ Education Society.

AIMS got a place in India Rankings 2019: Management (Rank-band: 76-100).It was ranked by NIRF.

Academics

AIMS Institutes comprises five schools: Business, Commerce, Information Technology (IT), Hospitality and Tourism, and Arts and Humanities. These schools offer various postgraduate and undergraduate courses.

References

1994 establishments in Karnataka
Colleges affiliated to Bangalore University
Colleges in Bangalore
Educational institutions established in 1994